USS LST-477/LST(H)-477 was a United States Navy  used in the Asiatic-Pacific Theater during World War II.

Construction
LST-477 was laid down on 12 August 1942, under Maritime Commission (MARCOM) contract, MC hull 997, by  Kaiser Shipyards, Yard No. 4, Richmond, California; launched on 29 October 1942, sponsored by Mrs. Mary K. McNeil; and commissioned on 19 February 1943.

Service history
During the war, LST-477 was assigned to the Asiatic-Pacific Theater. She took part in the Gilbert Islands operation November and December 1943; the Occupation of Kwajalein and Majuro Atolls in February 1944; the Battle of Guam in July 1944; and the Battle of Iwo Jima in February 1945.

Post-war service
Following the war, LST-477 was redesignated LST(H)-477 on 15 September 1945. She performed occupation duty in the Far East until mid-February 1946. Upon her return to the United States and struck from the Navy list on 28 August 1947. On 27 March 1948, the ship was sold to the Consolidated Builders, Inc., Seattle, Washington, and subsequently scrapped.

Honors and awards
LST-477 earned four battle stars and the Navy Unit Commendation for her World War II service.

Notes 

Citations

Bibliography 

Online resources

External links

 

LST-1-class tank landing ships
World War II amphibious warfare vessels of the United States
Ships built in Richmond, California
1942 ships
S3-M2-K2 ships